Fighter Squadron 7 or VF-7 was an aviation unit of the U.S. Navy, originally established on 3 January 1944, it was disestablished on 8 June 1946. It was the second US Navy squadron to be designated VF-7.

Operational history
VF-7 reequipped with the F6F-5 Hellcat at Naval Air Station Quonset in July 1944 and then reembarked on USS Hancock.

By September 1944 USS Hancock and CVG-7 had joined the Pacific Fleet.

From February–September 1945 CVG-7 was shore-based at Naval Station Puget Sound and then Naval Air Station Astoria.

Home port assignments
Naval Air Station Quonset
Naval Station Puget Sound
Naval Air Station Astoria

Aircraft assignment
F6F-3/5 Hellcat

See also
List of inactive United States Navy aircraft squadrons
History of the United States Navy

References

External links

Aircraft squadrons of the United States Navy